The Italian Wikipedia is the Italian-language edition of Wikipedia. This edition was created on May 11, 2001, and first edited on June 11, 2001. It is the -largest Wikipedia by the number of articles (after the English, Swedish, German, Dutch, French, Cebuano, Russian, and Spanish editions).

History
As early as March 2001, Jimmy Wales, the creator and co-founder of the original English language Wikipedia, had proposed the creation of parallel Wikipedia projects in other languages. The Italian-language version was among the first ones to be created, in May 2001. The very first pages (circa five hundred) were simply untranslated copies from the English-language Wikipedia; the first edits were made from June 11, 2001, onwards.

One of the earlier edits was an appeal to help Nupedia; the first entries on the Italian Wikipedia were the pages on Dante Alighieri, Petrarch, Manzoni, and other Italian writers. The edits were not numerous, and the priority was initially given to helping Nupedia; the lemmas were just twenty or thirty, and there were about ten users. With the end of the Nupedia project, the situation began to improve for the Italian Wikipedia: users started to sign in, and the functions of administrators and semi-protection were implemented. This happened by 2004; the number of articles was now 56,000.

In August 2005 the Italian Wikipedia overtook the Spanish and Portuguese language editions, becoming the 8th largest edition by article count. The primary reason for the rapid leap from 56,000 to 64,000 articles was an automated bot which created stub articles on more than 8,000 municipalities of Spain in an operation dubbed "Comuni spagnoli".

On September 8, 2005, the Italian Wikipedia overtook the Dutch Wikipedia and one day later, on September 9, it passed 100,000 articles. On September 11, it overtook the Swedish Wikipedia, becoming the fifth-largest language edition. Again, automated scripts contributed heavily to the growth. For instance, a bot created more than 35,000 articles on municipalities of France. However, it was overtaken by the Polish edition on September 23, 2005.

In June 2006, Italian Wikipedia users independently created the Template:Bio (with "Bio" being a diminutive of biografia, "biography"). On October 23, the Polish version again surpassed the Italian Wikipedia by number of articles. As of October 16, 2006, the registered number of users was 100,000 (90 of which were administrators).

In 2007, the Italian Wikipedia adopted an Exemption Doctrin Policy, shared with other Wikipedias. In the same year, on 21 May, there were more than 300,000 entries. On January 22, 2008, the entries were 400,000; on October 3, they were 500,000. The number of users had reached 250,000.

In 2009 the Italian Wikipedia was awarded the Premiolino, the oldest and most prestigious Italian journalism prize, in the new media category.

On June 22, 2010, it passed 700,000 articles (Robie House – 700,000th article). On September 28, 2010, the Italian Wikipedia overtook the Polish Wikipedia, becoming the 4th largest edition, though in October 2010 the numbers on both Wikipedias were very close, and as of 2011 the Polish Wikipedia was in the lead again.
On May 12, 2011, it passed 800,000 articles. On the same day, it overtook the Polish Wikipedia. On March 12, 2012, it passed 900,000 articles. On January 22, 2013, it passed 1,000,000 articles.

In April 2016, the project had 2233 active editors who made at least five edits in that month.

In March 2022, the project has 121 administrators.

2011 mass blanking protest

From October 4 to 6, 2011, following a decision adopted by volunteers of the Italian Wikipedia community, a knowledge blackout was in place. During this time, all of the site's articles were hidden and the website was blocked by its administrators, as a protest against the DDL intercettazioni (Wiretapping Bill), which was being debated at the time in the Chamber of Deputies of the Italian parliament.

The controversy largely centered on paragraph 29 of the proposed bill. According to a public statement by editors of the Italian Wikipedia:

The bill allowed for a fine of between €9,500 and €12,000.

This was the first time that a Wikipedia had blanked all its content to protest. The Wikimedia Foundation officially supported the decision of the Italian Wikipedia by a statement released the same day.  the manifesto, which replaced the Italian Wikipedia, had been viewed approximately 8 million times. On October 6, 2011, the website content was restored, with a banner across the top of each page explaining the reason for the protest.

Other shutdowns

On January 18, 2012, the English Wikipedia was shut down for 24 hours, following a decision by contributors to protest against two bills being examined by the Congress of the United States: the Stop Online Piracy Act and the Protect Intellectual Property Act. On that day, the Italian Wikipedia redirected users from its own main page to a black page expressing a message of support to the decision of the English encyclopedia. Users could then click to access the Italian encyclopedia's content normally.

On July 10, 2012, when the Russian Wikipedia was closed to protest State Duma’s debating of amendments to the law "On information" (Law Project No. 89417-6), the Italian Wikipedia displayed a site-wide banner supporting the protest.

In November 2012, messages appeared on the Italian Wikipedia protesting the Italian Senate's Bill #3491, 3204, 3.400 and especially 3.207.

From July 3 to 5, 2018, to protest the Directive on Copyright in the Digital Single Market, the Italian Wikipedia displayed a site-wide banner supporting the protest, and disabled all searches and contributions.

From March 25, 2019 for the following 24 hours, Italian Wikipedia contents were not accessible, replaced by a message encouraging the readers to contact their European Parliament representatives to vote against Article 11 and Article 13 of the European Copyright Directive to be discussed on May 26.

Features 

 The Italian Wikipedia currently accepts free images licensed under the GFDL and Creative Commons. Fair use images have been rejected since April 2006 due to potential copyright problems, and many of them were subsequently replaced during 2007 with equivalents which follow Italian law.
 Unlike the English, French and German Wikipedias, the Italian Wikipedia does not have an Arbitration Committee.
 The Italian Wikipedia has used automated scripts to create articles, much like the English Wikipedia.
 Administrators are elected through a vote; a minimal quorum of 65–70 voters and 80% of support votes are required if the request is to be considered successful. Any administrator is automatically open to recall after a year of service. The community then decides whether to let them keep the role or not with a vote. Administrators who have been inactive (have not used any administrative tools such as the "delete" or "block" buttons) for six months automatically lose their privileges.

References

External links 

Wikipedias by language
Wikipedia
Internet properties established in 2001
Italian-language websites
Wikipedias in Romance languages